The Baltimore Canaries played in 1873 as a  member of the National Association of Professional Base Ball Players. They finished third in the league with a record of 34–22.

Regular season

Season standings

Record vs. opponents

Roster

Player stats

Batting
Note: G = Games played; AB = At bats; H = Hits; Avg. = Batting average; HR = Home runs; RBI = Runs batted in

Starting pitchers 
Note: G = Games pitched; IP = Innings pitched; W = Wins; L = Losses; ERA = Earned run average; SO = Strikeouts

Relief pitchers 
Note: G = Games pitched; W = Wins; L = Losses; SV = Saves; ERA = Earned run average; SO = Strikeouts

References
1873 Baltimore Canaries season at Baseball Reference

Baltimore Canaries seasons
Baltimore Canaries Season, 1873
1873 in American sports
Baltimore Canaries